Ceratostema rauhii, is a species of Ceratostema found in Peru south east of Chiclayo at elevations around 2200 meters.

References

External links
 
 
Ceratostema rauhii Description at NYBG

rauhii
Flora of Peru
Plants described in 1992